Fighting Steel is a 1999 video game by Strategic Simulations, Inc. (SSI). It depicts naval surface combat in World War II and is similar to another game by SSI, Great Naval Battles. Subsequently, SSI/DBZ granted permission to Naval Warfare Simulations to create expansions and upgrades to Fighting Steel, which were produced for free download between 2005 and 2008.

The game features an in-game camera, and ability to command several ships at once.

See also
:Category:Naval battles and operations of World War II

References

External links
 Game review, subsim.com
NWS Fighting Steel Project

1999 video games
Ship simulation games
Naval video games
Naval games
Strategic Simulations games
Video games developed in the United States
Windows games
Windows-only games
World War II video games
Computer wargames